was a Japanese actor from Kamakura, Kanagawa, Japan. He appeared in the second series of Monkey as the horse. He appeared in the Death Note live-action movie as Quillsh Wammy A.K.A. Watari.

Filmography

Film
Seishun kigeki: Harenchi gakuen (1970)
Kigeki kankon-sousai nyûmon (1970) - Fujiwara
Tokyo Heaven (1990) - Katsu Hashimoto
Welcome Back, Mr. McDonald (1997) - Mansaku Iori
Hakuchi (1999) - The tailor
Ultraman Cosmos: The First Contact (2001) - Professor Kinomoto
Quartet (2001) - Shunkichi Fujioka
Ganryujima (2003) - Todoroki
Hero? Tenshi ni aeba... (2004)
Gosuto shauto (2004)
Kogitsune Heren (2006) - Professor Uehara
Hatsukoi (2006) - Motorcycle seller
Death Note (2006) - Watari
Death Note 2: The Last Name (2006) - Watari
Helen the Baby Fox (2006) - Manager of Coffee Lounge
L: Change the WorLd (2008) - Watari
Bura bura ban ban (2008)
Fukemon (2008)
Nakumonka (2009)
Kyôretsu môretsu! Kodai shôjo Dogu-chan matsuri! Supesharu mûbî edishon (2010)
Futatabi (2010) - Kenzaburo's bandmate

Television
Monkey (1979) - Hazama Hyôsuke
Osama no Restaurant (1995)
Sōrito Yobanaide (1997) - Vice prime
Fukigen na Kajitsu (1997)
Kamisan nanka kowakunai (????)
Oatsui no ga Osuki (????)
Omizu no Hanamichi (1999) - Matsushima
Rikon Bengoshi (2004)
Kaiki Daikazoku (2004) - Fuchio Imawano
Fight (2005)
Densha Otoko DX~Saigo no Seizen (2006) - Saori's Grandfather
Imo Tako Nankin (2006)
Happy Boys (2007) - Kura Shikawaichi

Anime
The Mouse and His Child (1977) - Ralphie
Nutcracker Fantasy (1979) - Indian Wiseman
Black Butler (2008-2009, TV Series) - Tanaka
Black Butler II (2010, TV Series) - Tanaka
Black Butler: Book of Circus (2014, TV Series) - Tanaka

References

External links

1934 births
2017 deaths
Japanese male film actors
Male actors from Kanagawa Prefecture
People from Kamakura